TMI may refer to:

Organizations
 TMI Associates, a Japanese law firm
 TMI Episcopal, formerly Texas Military Institute, a preparatory school affiliated with the Episcopal Church
 Taiwan Music Institute, a musical institute` in Taiwan
 Teen Missions International, an interdenominational mission organization based in Florida
 Three Mile Island Nuclear Generating Station, a nuclear power station in Pennsylvania, USA
 Time Module (TMI), a member of the Seiko Group, manufacturer of watch movements
 Toastmasters International, an international public speaking organization
 Tolani Maritime Institute, a Merchant Navy training institute
 The Monroe Institute, a nonprofit education and research organization
 Thomas More Institute, a secular academic institution located in Montreal, Quebec, Canada

Science
 Trans-Mars injection, a propulsive maneuver used to set a spacecraft on a trajectory which will cause it to arrive to Mars
 Transmarginal inhibition, a mental response to extreme stresses or pain
 Trimethylindium, the most preferred metalorganic indium source for the MOCVD of Compound Semiconductors

Other uses
 TMI, abbreviation for "Too much information", indicating information overload or excessively personal information
 "T.M.I." (South Park), a 2011 episode
 TMI Mudlib (TMI or TMI-2), online game software named for The Mud Institute
 The Mortal Instruments, a series of books by Cassandra Clare
 Sam & Mark's TMi Friday, previously called TMi, a Saturday morning show on CBBC
 Ton-mile or tmi, a unit of freight transportation quantity
 Tumlingtar Airport, an airport serving Tumlingtar, a city in Nepal
 "TMI" a song by Joan Jett and the Blackhearts from the 2013 album Unvarnished